Bantu Kavirondo is the former name given to some of the Bantu peoples of western Kenya (e.g., the Luhya and Kisii) under the early colonial regime of British East Africa. Kavirondo Gulf (Winam Gulf) and the surrounding area of "Kavirondo" derive from the same name. They were designated “Bantu" Kavirondo in contradistinction to the “Nilotic Kavirondo” (Luo).

The term should no longer be used.

Ethnic groups in Kenya